Alexander Neville (1544–1614) was an English scholar, known as a historian and translator and a Member of the House of Commons.

Life
Alexander Neville was the brother of Thomas Neville, Dean of Canterbury, and son of Richard Neville of South Leverton, Nottinghamshire, by Anne Mantell, daughter of Sir Walter Mantell (d.1529) of Nether Heyford, Northamptonshire. His mother's sister, Margaret Mantell, was the mother of the poet Barnabe Googe.

Alexander was educated at the University of Cambridge, where he graduated M.A. in 1581, at the same time as Robert Devereux, 2nd Earl of Essex. On leaving the university he seems to have studied law in London, where he became acquainted with George Gascoigne. He is one of the five friends whom Gascoigne describes as challenging him to write poems on Latin mottoes proposed by themselves. Neville soon entered the service of Archbishop Matthew Parker apparently as a secretary, and edited for him Tabula Heptarchiae Saxonicae.

He attended Parker's funeral on 6 June 1575, and wrote an elegy in Latin heroics. He remained in the service of Parker's successors, Edmund Grindal and John Whitgift.  Possibly he is identical with the Alexander Neville who sat in parliament as M.P. for Christchurch, Hampshire, in 1585, and for Saltash in 1601. He died on 4 October 1614, and was buried on 9 October in Canterbury Cathedral, where the dean erected a monument to commemorate both his brother and himself. He married Jane, daughter of Richard Duncombe of Morton, Buckinghamshire, and widow of Sir Gilbert Dethick, but left no issue.

Neville was a Member of Parliament, representing  Christchurch in the Parliament of 1585, for Peterborough in 1597 and Saltash in that of 1601. But he appears to have been inactive.

Works

His major work was an account in Latin of Kett's rebellion of 1549, to which he appended a description of Norwich and its antiquities. The work, which was undertaken under Parker's guidance, was entitled A. Nevylii ... de Furoribus Norfolcensium Ketto Duce. Eiusdem Norvicus, London (by Henry Binneman), 1575. A list of the mayors and sheriffs of Norwich was added. The dedication was addressed to Parker, and Thomas Drant prefixed verses. A passage in it spoke of the laziness of the Welsh levies who had taken part in the suppression of Kett's rebellion, and compared the Welsh soldiers to sheep. Offence was taken by the government at this sneer, and a new edition was at once issued with the offensive sentences omitted and an additional dedication to Archbishop Grindal, the successor of Parker. Neville also published in 1576 'A. Nevylii ad Walliae proceres apologia' (London, by Henry Binneman), in which he acknowledged his error of judgment. The account of Kett was appended under the title 'Kettus' to Christopher Ockland's Anglorum Praelia, 1582, and in 1615 an English translation by the Rev. Richard Woods of Norwich appeared with the title Norfolk Furies their Foyle under Kett and their Accursed Captaine: with a description of the famous Citye of Norwich; another edition is dated 1623.

Neville was also a writer of Latin verse and prose. His earliest publication was a translation of Seneca's Oedipus, into a rough ballad metre in 1563. Thomas Newton included it in his Seneca his Tenne Tragedies, London, 1581. In 1587 appeared Neville's Academiae Cantabrigiensis lacrymse tumulo ... P. Sidneij sacratae per A. Nevillum, Cambridge, 1587, with a dedication to the Earl of Leicester. Sir John Harington commended this poem in his annotations on Ariosto's Orlando Furioso (bk. 37).

Neville also contributed English verses to his cousin Barnabe Googe's Eglogs and Sonettes, 1563.

Notes

References

Attribution

External links
 

English translators
Alumni of St John's College, Cambridge
1544 births
1614 deaths
16th-century English historians
16th-century translators
17th-century English historians
17th-century translators
Alexander
Members of the pre-1707 English Parliament for constituencies in Cornwall
English MPs 1589
English MPs 1597–1598
English MPs 1601